Dehydrogenase/reductase (SDR family) member 7B is an enzyme encoded by the DHRS7B gene in humans, found on chromosome 17p11.2. DHRS7B encodes a protein that is predicted to function in steroid hormone regulation. A deletion in the chromosomal region 17p11.2 has been associated with Smith-Magenis Syndrome, a genetic developmental disorder.

Gene

Overview 

The DHRS7B gene is located on the positive strand of chromosome 17, beginning at position 21030258 and ending at position 21094836 (64579 bp). DHRS7B contains seven exons with no predicted alternate splice forms, resulting in an 1841 bp mRNA product.

Upstream of DHRS7B on the negative strand of chromosome 17p11.2 are the genes Coiled-coil domain containing 144 family, N-terminal-like (CCDC144NL) and Ubiquitin specific peptidase 22 (USP22). Downstream of DHSRS7B on the negative strand of chromosome 17p11.2 is the gene Transmembrane protein 11 (TMEM11), and on the positive strand is the gene Mitogen-activated protein kinase, kinase 3 (MAP2K3).

Gene expression 

Microarray and EST data indicates that the DHRS7B gene is highly expressed in the testes, thyroid, kidneys, and adipose tissues.  There is moderate expression in the brain, pancreas, mammary glands, and ovaries.  Finally, there is little expression in spleen, thymus, tonsils, bone marrow, and bladder.

Protein structure 

The DHRS7B gene has a predicted protein product that is 325 amino acids, a molecular weight of 35.1 kDa, and an isoelectric point of 9.867.  There is one predicted transmembrane domain in the protein sequence, a large neutrally charged region spanning residues 18-38.  No signal peptides have been identified in DHRS7B; cellular localization remains unclear.

DHRS7B is a member of the short chain dehydrogenase/reductase (SDR) superfamily and possesses characteristic features of an SDR within the protein sequence.  The following table identifies sequences in the protein and corresponding function.

Interactions 

In humans, DHRS7B has been shown to physically interact with other proteins such as Mediator complex subunit 19 (MED19) and Brain and reproductive expressed-modulator protein (BRE). MED19 was found to interact with DHRS7B through a two hybrid screening approach and plays a role as a co-activator in regulated transcription of most RNA polymerase II dependent genes. BRE is a component of the BRCA1-A complex, which recognizes Lys-63 linked ubiquitinated histones H2A and H2AX DNA lesion sites (identified using anti-tag coimmunoprecipitation).  Other proteins interacting with DHRS7B have only been identified through text mining.

Homology

Orthologs 

Conservation of the DHRS7B protein sequence has been observed highly in mammals; moderately in reptiles, birds, fish and amphibians; minimally in invertebrates, insects, and fungi.

Paralogs 

Paralogs of DHRS7B are all in the SDR superfamily and conservation of the SDR functional motifs was identified in a multiple sequence alignment.

Clinical significance 

DHRS7B has been identified in the Smith-Magenis Syndrome region, where a deletion in this chromosomal region (17p11.2) causes a genetic developmental disorder. In breast cancer cells expressing CD44 and CD24, DHRS7B expression was observed to be down regulated. CD44 is an antigen found on the surface of most cell types and functions as a receptor that binds tissue macromolecules.  Additionally, it acts as an adhesion molecule for leukocytes on peripheral lymphoid organs and inflammation sites.  CD24 is associated with B-cells, epithelial cells, and dendritic cells, functioning as an adhesion molecule and shown to enhance a tumor cell's capability of metastasizing.

References

EC 1.1